The 95th Academy Awards was a ceremony held by the Academy of Motion Picture Arts and Sciences (AMPAS) on March 12, 2023, at the Dolby Theatre in Los Angeles. It honored films released in 2022.

The event was televised in the U.S. by ABC and was produced by Ricky Kirshner and Glenn Weiss. Weiss was also the director. Comedian and late-night talk show host Jimmy Kimmel hosted the show for the third time, after emceeing the 89th and 90th editions of the ceremony in 2017 and 2018, respectively.

Everything Everywhere All at Once led the ceremony with eleven nominations and seven wins, including Best Picture. Other winners included All Quiet on the Western Front with four awards, The Whale with two, and Top Gun: Maverick, Black Panther: Wakanda Forever, Avatar: The Way of Water, Women Talking, RRR, Guillermo del Toro's Pinocchio, and Navalny each with one. Short film winners included An Irish Goodbye, The Boy, the Mole, the Fox and the Horse, and The Elephant Whisperers.

Winners and nominees
The nominations were announced by actors Riz Ahmed and Allison Williams on January 24, 2023.

It was the first time the Best Picture category featured two sequels, Avatar: The Way of Water and Top Gun: Maverick, as well as the first time two films grossing over $1 billion worldwide were nominated for Best Picture in the same year. All Quiet on the Western Fronts nine nominations trailed only Crouching Tiger, Hidden Dragon (2000) and Roma (2018) for the most nominations by a film not in the English language. The Quiet Girl was the first submission from Ireland to receive a nomination for Best International Feature Film.

There were 16 first-time nominees across the four acting categories, including all five Best Actor nominees, the most in Oscar history. Michelle Yeoh was the first woman who identifies as Asian nominated for Best Actress. A record four Asian actors received acting nominations: Hong Chau, Stephanie Hsu, and winners Ke Huy Quan and Yeoh. With her Best Supporting Actress nomination for Black Panther: Wakanda Forever, Angela Bassett became the first person to receive an acting nomination for a role in a film based on Marvel Comics. 

Judd Hirsch, nominated for Best Supporting Actor for his role in The Fabelmans, set a new record for longest gap between two acting nominations, following his nomination for Ordinary People (1980). At age 90, John Williams is the oldest competitive nominee in Oscar history; this was his 53rd nomination, breaking his own record as the most Oscar-nominated living person, and the second-most nominated person of all time behind Walt Disney. For his nomination for Le pupille for Live Action Short Film, Alfonso Cuarón became the second person to be nominated in seven different categories, following Kenneth Branagh. The film also was Disney+'s first nomination for the award.

Everything Everywhere All at Once became the first film since 2013's Gravity to win seven Academy Awards, and the most awarded Best Picture winner since 2008's Slumdog Millionaire. It is the third film in history to win in three acting categories, following A Streetcar Named Desire (1951) and Network (1976). A24 won nine awards, more than any other studio or distributor; with Everything Everywhere All at Once and The Whale, the studio was the first to win seven of the eight top awardsBest Picture, Best Director, Best Original Screenplay, and the four acting awards, missing only Best Adapted Screenplay.

Awards

Winners are listed first, highlighted in boldface, and indicated with a double dagger (‡).

{| class="wikitable" role="presentation"
| style="vertical-align:top; width:50%;"| 
 Everything Everywhere All at Once – Daniel Kwan, Daniel Scheinert, and Jonathan Wang, producers All Quiet on the Western Front – Malte Grunert, producer
 Avatar: The Way of Water – James Cameron and Jon Landau, producers
 The Banshees of Inisherin – Graham Broadbent, Peter Czernin, and Martin McDonagh, producers
 Elvis – Baz Luhrmann, Catherine Martin, Gail Berman, Patrick McCormick, and Schuyler Weiss, producers
 The Fabelmans – Kristie Macosko Krieger, Steven Spielberg, and Tony Kushner, producers
 Tár – Todd Field, Alexandra Milchan, and Scott Lambert, producers
 Top Gun: Maverick – Tom Cruise, Christopher McQuarrie, David Ellison, and Jerry Bruckheimer, producers
 Triangle of Sadness – Erik Hemmendorff and Philippe Bober, producers
 Women Talking – Dede Gardner, Jeremy Kleiner, and Frances McDormand, producers
| style="vertical-align:top; width:50%;"| 
 Daniel Kwan and Daniel Scheinert – Everything Everywhere All at Once
 Martin McDonagh – The Banshees of Inisherin
 Steven Spielberg – The Fabelmans
 Todd Field – Tár
 Ruben Östlund – Triangle of Sadness
|-
| style="vertical-align:top; width:50%;"| 
 Brendan Fraser – The Whale as Charlie
 Austin Butler – Elvis as Elvis Presley
 Colin Farrell – The Banshees of Inisherin as Pádraic Súilleabháin
 Paul Mescal – Aftersun as Calum Paterson
 Bill Nighy – Living as Mr. Rodney Williams
| style="vertical-align:top; width:50%;"| 
 Michelle Yeoh – Everything Everywhere All at Once as Evelyn Quan Wang
 Ana de Armas – Blonde as Norma Jeane
 Cate Blanchett – Tár as Lydia Tár
 Andrea Riseborough – To Leslie as Leslie Rowlands
 Michelle Williams – The Fabelmans as Mitzi Schildkraut-Fabelman
|-
| style="vertical-align:top; width:50%;"| 
 Ke Huy Quan – Everything Everywhere All at Once as Waymond Wang
 Brendan Gleeson – The Banshees of Inisherin as Colm Doherty
 Brian Tyree Henry – Causeway as James Aucoin
 Judd Hirsch – The Fabelmans as Boris Podgorny
 Barry Keoghan – The Banshees of Inisherin as Dominic Kearney
| style="vertical-align:top; width:50%;"| 
 Jamie Lee Curtis – Everything Everywhere All at Once as Deirdre Beaubeirdre
 Angela Bassett – Black Panther: Wakanda Forever as Queen Ramonda
 Hong Chau – The Whale as Liz
 Kerry Condon – The Banshees of Inisherin as Siobhán Súilleabháin 
 Stephanie Hsu – Everything Everywhere All at Once as Joy Wang / Jobu Tupaki
|-
| style="vertical-align:top; width:50%;"| 
 Everything Everywhere All at Once – Daniel Kwan and Daniel Scheinert
 The Banshees of Inisherin – Martin McDonagh
 The Fabelmans – Steven Spielberg and Tony Kushner
 Tár – Todd Field
 Triangle of Sadness – Ruben Östlund
| style="vertical-align:top; width:50%;"| 
 Women Talking – Sarah Polley; based on the novel by Miriam Toews All Quiet on the Western Front – Edward Berger, Lesley Paterson, and Ian Stokell; based on the novel by Erich Maria Remarque
 Glass Onion: A Knives Out Mystery – Rian Johnson; based on characters created by Johnson and the film Knives Out
 Living – Kazuo Ishiguro; based on the original motion picture screenplay Ikiru by Akira Kurosawa, Shinobu Hashimoto, and Hideo Oguni
 Top Gun: Maverick – Screenplay by Ehren Kruger, Eric Warren Singer, and Christopher McQuarrie; Story by Peter Craig and Justin Marks; based on the film Top Gun written by Jim Cash and Jack Epps Jr.
|-
| style="vertical-align:top; width:50%;"| 
 Guillermo del Toro's Pinocchio – Guillermo del Toro, Mark Gustafson, Gary Ungar, and Alex Bulkley Marcel the Shell with Shoes On – Dean Fleischer Camp, Elisabeth Holm, Andrew Goldman, Caroline Kaplan, and Paul Mezey
 Puss in Boots: The Last Wish – Joel Crawford and Mark Swift
 The Sea Beast – Chris Williams and Jed Schlanger
 Turning Red – Domee Shi and Lindsey Collins
| style="vertical-align:top; width:50%;"| 
 All Quiet on the Western Front (Germany) – directed by Edward Berger Argentina, 1985 (Argentina) – directed by Santiago Mitre
 Close (Belgium) – directed by Lukas Dhont
 EO (Poland) – directed by Jerzy Skolimowski
 The Quiet Girl (Ireland) – directed by Colm Bairéad
|-
| style="vertical-align:top; width:50%;"| 
 Navalny – Daniel Roher, Odessa Rae, Diane Becker, Melanie Miller, and Shane Boris All That Breathes – Shaunak Sen, Aman Mann, and Teddy Leifer
 All the Beauty and the Bloodshed – Laura Poitras, Howard Gertler, John Lyons, Nan Goldin, and Yoni Golijov
 Fire of Love – Sara Dosa, Shane Boris, and Ina Fichman
 A House Made of Splinters – Simon Lereng Wilmont and Monica Hellström
| style="vertical-align:top; width:50%;"| 
 The Elephant Whisperers – Kartiki Gonsalves and Guneet Monga Haulout – Evgenia Arbugaeva and Maxim Arbugaev
 How Do You Measure a Year? – Jay Rosenblatt
 The Martha Mitchell Effect – Anne Alvergue and Beth Levison
 Stranger at the Gate – Joshua Seftel and Conall Jones
|-
| style="vertical-align:top; width:50%;"| 
 An Irish Goodbye – Tom Berkeley and Ross White Ivalu – Anders Walter and Rebecca Pruzan
 Le pupille – Alice Rohrwacher and Alfonso Cuarón
 Night Ride – Eirik Tveiten and Gaute Lid Larssen
 The Red Suitcase – Cyrus Neshvad
| style="vertical-align:top; width:50%;"| 
 The Boy, the Mole, the Fox and the Horse – Charlie Mackesy and Matthew Freud The Flying Sailor – Wendy Tilby and Amanda Forbis
 Ice Merchants – João Gonzalez and Bruno Caetano
 My Year of Dicks – Sara Gunnarsdóttir and Pamela Ribon
 An Ostrich Told Me the World Is Fake and I Think I Believe It – Lachlan Pendragon
|-
| style="vertical-align:top; width:50%;"| 
 All Quiet on the Western Front – Volker Bertelmann Babylon – Justin Hurwitz
 The Banshees of Inisherin – Carter Burwell
 Everything Everywhere All at Once – Son Lux
 The Fabelmans – John Williams
| style="vertical-align:top; width:50%;"| 
 "Naatu Naatu" from RRR – Music by M. M. Keeravani; Lyrics by Chandrabose "Applause" from Tell It Like a Woman – Music and lyrics by Diane Warren
 "Hold My Hand" from Top Gun: Maverick – Music and lyrics by Lady Gaga and BloodPop
 "Lift Me Up" from Black Panther: Wakanda Forever – Music by Tems, Rihanna, Ryan Coogler, and Ludwig Göransson; Lyrics by Tems and Ryan Coogler
 "This Is a Life" from Everything Everywhere All at Once – Music by Ryan Lott, David Byrne, and Mitski; Lyrics by Ryan Lott and David Byrne
|-
| style="vertical-align:top; width:50%;"| 
 Top Gun: Maverick – Mark Weingarten, James H. Mather, Al Nelson, Chris Burdon, and Mark Taylor All Quiet on the Western Front – Viktor Prášil, Frank Kruse, Markus Stemler, Lars Ginzel, and Stefan Korte
 Avatar: The Way of Water – Julian Howarth, Gwendolyn Yates Whittle, Dick Bernstein, Christopher Boyes, Gary Summers, and Michael Hedges
 The Batman – Stuart Wilson, William Files, Douglas Murray, and Andy Nelson
 Elvis – David Lee, Wayne Pashley, Andy Nelson, and Michael Keller
| style="vertical-align:top; width:50%;"| 
 All Quiet on the Western Front – Production Design: Christian M. Goldbeck; Set Decoration: Ernestine Hipper Avatar: The Way of Water – Production Design: Dylan Cole and Ben Procter; Set Decoration: Vanessa Cole
 Babylon – Production Design: Florencia Martin; Set Decoration: Anthony Carlino
 Elvis – Production Design: Catherine Martin and Karen Murphy; Set Decoration: Bev Dunn
 The Fabelmans – Production Design: Rick Carter; Set Decoration: Karen O'Hara
|-
| style="vertical-align:top; width:50%;"| 
 All Quiet on the Western Front – James Friend Bardo, False Chronicle of a Handful of Truths – Darius Khondji
 Elvis – Mandy Walker
 Empire of Light – Roger Deakins
 Tár – Florian Hoffmeister
| style="vertical-align:top; width:50%;"| 
 The Whale – Adrien Morot, Judy Chin, and Anne Marie Bradley All Quiet on the Western Front – Heike Merker and Linda Eisenhamerová
 The Batman – Naomi Donne, Mike Marino, and Mike Fontaine
 Black Panther: Wakanda Forever – Camille Friend and Joel Harlow
 Elvis – Mark Coulier, Jason Baird, and Aldo Signoretti
|-
| style="vertical-align:top; width:50%;"| 
 Black Panther: Wakanda Forever – Ruth E. Carter Babylon – Mary Zophres
 Elvis – Catherine Martin
 Everything Everywhere All at Once – Shirley Kurata
 Mrs. Harris Goes to Paris – Jenny Beavan
| style="vertical-align:top; width:50%;"| 
 Everything Everywhere All at Once – Paul Rogers The Banshees of Inisherin – Mikkel E. G. Nielsen
 Elvis – Matt Villa and Jonathan Redmond
 Tár – Monika Willi
 Top Gun: Maverick – Eddie Hamilton
|-
| style="vertical-align:top; width:50%;" | 
 Avatar: The Way of Water'' – Joe Letteri, Richard Baneham, Eric Saindon, and Daniel Barrett
 All Quiet on the Western Front – Frank Petzold, Viktor Müller, Markus Frank, and Kamil Jafar
 The Batman – Dan Lemmon, Russell Earl, Anders Langlands, and Dominic Tuohy
 Black Panther: Wakanda Forever – Geoffrey Baumann, Craig Hammack, R. Christopher White, and Dan Sudick
 Top Gun: Maverick – Ryan Tudhope, Seth Hill, Bryan Litson, and Scott R. Fisher
|
|}

Governors Awards
On June 21, 2022, the Academy announced its winners of the 13th annual Governors Awards ceremony. It was held on November 19, 2022, and during the event, the Academy Honorary Awards and the Jean Hersholt Humanitarian Award were presented to the following recipients:

Academy Honorary Awards
 Euzhan Palcy
 Diane Warren
 Peter Weir

Jean Hersholt Humanitarian Award
 Michael J. Fox

Films with multiple nominations and awards

Presenters and performers
The following presented awards and performed musical numbers.

Ceremony information

On February 11, 2023, a majority of the full production team was announced, with Rob Paine as a co-executive producer, Sarah Levine Hall, Raj Kapoor, Erin Irwin, and Jennifer Sharron joining as producers, Rickey Minor returning as music director since the 2020 ceremony, Taryn Hurd as talent producer, Dave Boone, Nefetari Spencer, and Agathe Panaretos as writers, and Robert Dickinson returning as lighting designer.

For the Best Original Song performance of "This Is a Life" from Everything Everywhere All at Once, Japanese singer Mitski, who performs the song in the film with David Byrne, was unavailable to perform it at the ceremony, with Stephanie Hsu taking her place. M. M. Keeravani served as music director for the performance of "Naatu Naatu" from RRR by singers Kaala Bhairava and Rahul Sipligunj, which involved Los Angeles-based dancers performing the song's choreography; however the film's stars N. T. Rama Rao Jr. and Ram Charan did not take part as they did not have time to rehearse. "Hold My Hand" was not initially scheduled to be performed at the ceremony due to Lady Gaga's commitment to filming Joker: Folie à Deux. However, at the last minute, it was reported that Gaga would perform the song after all. The official trailer for Disney's live-action remake of The Little Mermaid also debuted during the telecast, with stars Halle Bailey and Melissa McCarthy appearing as presenters to promote the film. Morgan Freeman and Margot Robbie also introduced a tribute to the 100th anniversary of Warner Bros. Both the trailer for The Little Mermaid and the Warner Bros. tribute were part of sponsored-integration opportunities offered by ABC to all the major film studios; the videos themselves aired as advertisements on the U.S. broadcast and were not screened in the Dolby Theatre or for all international viewers. Disney reportedly paid its subsidiary ABC $10 million to air the trailer, while Warner Bros. paid the network $3 million to air the tribute.

President of Ukraine Volodymyr Zelenskyy had reportedly requested to appear remotely at the ceremony to raise awareness of the Russian invasion of his country, but his request was turned down by the Academy. Glenn Close was originally announced as a presenter but was forced to cancel due to a positive COVID-19 test.

The look and feel of red carpet arrivals at the ceremony received a major overhaul overseen by creative consultants Lisa Love and Raúl Àvila, to create a smoother transition from the late-afternoon sunlight outside the auditorium to the evening setting inside (which had been noted by Academy CEO Bill Kramer as a recurring issue with the red carpet since its introduction at the 33rd Academy Awards). As part of these changes, the color of the eponymous red carpet was changed for the first time; the carpet was a champagne color contrasted by sienna-colored curtains which were designed to block more of the sun.

Andrea Riseborough's nomination and controversy
Andrea Riseborough's nomination for Best Actress for her film To Leslie was controversial amongst critics and pundits, as Momentum Pictures, the film's distributor, did not fund a conventional advertising-driven awards campaign for the film. Rather director Michael Morris and his wife, actress Mary McCormack, organized a "celeb-backed campaign" to get Riseborough nominated. They contacted friends and colleagues in the entertainment industry, asked them to view the film, and share it with others if they enjoyed it. Among those who lobbied for recognition of Riseborough's performance were Jodie Comer, Kate Winslet, Amy Adams, Edward Norton, Melanie Lynskey, Gwyneth Paltrow, Jane Fonda, Howard Stern, Jennifer Aniston, and fellow nominee Cate Blanchett. Morris and Riseborough also hired publicists to coordinate the efforts. While theretofore not widely regarded as a serious awards contender, the campaign successfully raised Riseborough's profile; dozens of celebrities praised her performance on social media, and some hosted screenings of the film during voting for the Academy Award nominations in January 2023. Riseborough was nominated for the award on January 24, which the Los Angeles Times called "one of the most shocking nominations in Oscar history".

After the nomination was announced, there was speculation that the tactics may have violated an Academy of Motion Picture Arts and Sciences rule against directly lobbying voters. A post on the film's Instagram account was criticized for possibly violating an Academy rule prohibiting "[singling] out 'the competition' by name" by featuring a quote from film critic Richard Roeper, who praised Riseborough's performance as better than Blanchett's in Tár, a fellow nominee for Best Actress. On January 27, the Academy announced they were "conducting a review of the campaign procedures around this year's nominees, to ensure that no guidelines were violated, and to inform us whether changes to the guidelines may be needed in a new era of social media and digital communication".

The Academy occasionally rescinds nominations if it is found that the nominee participated in unsanctioned campaigning. However there were no reports that Riseborough had been involved in such, or that any Academy members had lodged formal complaints about the campaign's behavior. On January 31, the Academy concluded its review by pledging to address "social media and outreach campaigning tactics" which they said caused "concern", but confirming that Riseborough's nomination would be retained.

 Best Supporting Actress award 
Before the ceremony, Angela Bassett was considered the favorite by some to win Best Supporting Actress for her role in Black Panther: Wakanda Forever, having previously won the Golden Globe Award and Critics' Choice Award in the category; however, Kerry Condon won the BAFTA Award and Jamie Lee Curtis won the Screen Actors Guild Award. The award was ultimately won by Curtis. This choice sparked several criticisms. Many commentators noted the difference in the two's reaction to the award being announced. Curtis appeared surprised, while Bassett was visibly disappointed. Some viewers saw this reaction as poor on Bassett's part. Others argued the award showed the Academy's bias against popular superhero films like Black Panther: Wakanda Forever.

Ratings and reception
The Academy Awards telecast scored 18.7 million viewers in the United States. However, despite a 12% viewership increase from the previous year, ratings were the third lowest ever in ceremony history.

"In Memoriam"

 Olivia Newton-John – singer, actress
 John Korty – director, producer
 May Routh – costume designer
 Louise Fletcher – actress
 John Zaritsky – cinematographer
 Albert Brenner – production designer
 Irene Papas – actress
 Mitchell Goldman – executive
 Bob Rafelson – director, writer, producer
 Albert Saiki – design engineer
 Ian Whittaker – set decorator
 Robbie Coltrane – actor
 Kirstie Alley – actress
 Ray Liotta – actor
 Vicky Eguia – publicity executive
 Angelo Badalamenti – composer
 Greg Jein – visual effects artist, model maker
 Neal Jimenez – writer, director
 Mike Hill – film editor
 Tom Luddy – producer, film festival co-founder
 Marina Goldovskaya – director, cinematographer, educator
 Christopher Tucker – special effects makeup artist
 Irene Cara – actress, singer, songwriter
 Gregory Allen Howard – writer, producer
 Owen Roizman – cinematographer
 Luster Bayless – costume designer
 Gray Frederickson – producer
 Robert Dalva – film editor
 Nichelle Nichols – actress
 Edward R. Pressman – producer
 Douglas McGrath – writer, director, actor
 Julia Reichert – producer, director
 Edie Landau – producer, executive
 Mike Moder – assistant director, producer
 Jean-Luc Godard – director, writer
 Ralph Eggleston – animator, production designer
 Marvin March – set decorator
 Burt Bacharach – composer
 Nick Bosustow – producer
 Clayton Pinney – special effects artist
 Simone Bar – casting director
 Donn Cambern – film editor
 Tom Whitlock – songwriter
 Amanda Mackey – casting director
 Angela Lansbury – actress
 Wolfgang Petersen – director, writer, producer
 John Dartigue – publicity executive
 Burny Mattinson – animator
 Maurizio Silvi – makeup artist
 Jacques Perrin – actor, producer, director
 Mary Alice – actress
 Gina Lollobrigida – actress
 Carl Bell – animator
 Douglas Kirkland – photographer
 Vangelis – composer, musician
 James Caan – actor, producer
 Raquel Welch – actress
 Walter Mirisch – producer, former President of the Academy

OmissionsDeadline noted that Charlbi Dean, Anne Heche, Tom Sizemore, Paul Sorvino, and Chaim Topol were not included in the televised segment. The Academy said before the ceremony it would honor "more than 200 filmmakers, artists, and executives" in its digital magazine A.frame; the segment ended with a URL being shown on-screen linking to tributes to other people not included in the tribute. As in past years, individuals who died close to the time of broadcast (as was the case with Sizemore and Topol) could not be included as the montage had already been created like actors Philip Baker Hall, Melinda Dillon, Tony Sirico, Jean-Louis Trintignant, David Warner and Cindy Williams and directors Mike Hodges and Hugh Hudson who were also not included.

See also

 2022 in film
 12th AACTA International Awards
 28th Critics' Choice Awards
 29th Screen Actors Guild Awards
 34th Producers Guild of America Awards
 38th Independent Spirit Awards
 43rd Golden Raspberry Awards
 50th Annie Awards
 54th NAACP Image Awards
 65th Annual Grammy Awards
 75th Directors Guild of America Awards
 75th Writers Guild of America Awards
 76th British Academy Film Awards
 80th Golden Globe Awards
 List of submissions to the 95th Academy Awards for Best International Feature Film

Notes

References

External links
 
 
 Oscars Channel at YouTube (run by the Academy of Motion Picture Arts and Sciences)

News resources
 Oscars 2023 at BBC News
 Oscars 2022 at The Guardian''

Other resources
 

2022 film awards
2022 awards in the United States
2023 awards in the United States
2023 in Los Angeles
March 2023 events in the United States
Academy Awards ceremonies
Television shows directed by Glenn Weiss